Christopher Oscanyan (28 April 1818 in Constantinople, Turkey – 1 August 1895 in Brooklyn, New York, United States) was an American-Armenian writer.

Biography
His parents, who were Armenians, christened him Hatchik, which he later changed to Christopher. He learned from private tutors the Armenian, Turkish, and modern Greek languages; to these he soon added Italian and French, and, having heard English spoken, he wished to learn it also. To this end he made the acquaintance of the American missionaries that had then lately arrived in Turkey. One of these, Harrison G. O. Dwight, took an interest in him, and after the death of Oscanyan's mother enabled him to go to the United States to obtain a liberal education.

Oscanyan arrived in New York City in 1835 and was at once matriculated at the University of the City of New York. Failing health compelled him to leave college in his junior year, and he joined the staff of civil engineers engaged in the construction of the Charleston, Cincinnati and Chicago Railroad.

Returning to Constantinople in 1841, he established the first newspaper that was published there in Armenian, the Astarar Püzantian (Byzantine Advertiser). But the authorities would not tolerate the expression of liberal opinions, and he was soon compelled to abandon the undertaking. In 1843 he became the private secretary of Ahmed Fethi Pasha, son-in-law of the sultan, and minister of ordnance. While he was thus engaged he was appointed special agent to purchase the trousseau of Adilé Sultana, who was about to be married to Mehmed Aali Pasha, and in this capacity he frequently visited the palace.

After the ceremony, Oscanyan acted as correspondent for several American and European newspapers. In 1849 he wrote a satirical romance in Armeno-Turkish, or Turkish written in the Armenian character, entitled Acaby. This was followed in 1851 by Veronica, another work of fiction, and by Bedig, a book for children. The same year he published an Armenian translation of The Mysteries of Paris. In 1853, with the assistance of others, he opened an Oriental museum in London, but the enterprise was not successful and he returned to New York.

In New York, Oscanyan wrote and published The Sultan and His People (New York, 1857), 16,000 copies of which were sold in four months. In 1868 Oscanyan was made Turkish consul general in New York City, and he held the office until 1874. Having occasion to visit Constantinople in 1872, he was assigned by the porte as the representative of the sultan in entertaining Gen. William Tecumseh Sherman during his visit to Turkey.

On resigning his consulship he again busied himself in literary pursuits in New York City. He wrote another work on Turkey and the libretto of a comic opera.

Publication 
 The Sultan and his People (1857)

Notes

References

External links

1818 births
1895 deaths
Journalists from Istanbul
Armenians from the Ottoman Empire
Turkish emigrants to the United States
American people of Armenian descent
19th-century American writers
19th-century writers from the Ottoman Empire
Diplomats of the Ottoman Empire
New York University alumni